David Frank McKinney (cited as Frank McKinney) (1928–2001) was a British-born ornithologist and ethologist, who worked in Canada and the USA and specialized in the social behavior of waterfowl.

Biography
Frank McKinney graduated in 1949 with a bachelor's degree in zoology from the University of Oxford. He received his Ph.D. in 1953 from the University of Bristol. His 227-page doctoral dissertation is titled "Studies of the behaviour of the Anatidae". As a postdoc in 1953 he worked with Nikolaas Tinbergen at the Wildfowl & Wetlands Trust in Slimbridge. From 1953 to 1963 he worked as a deputy director at the Delta Waterfowl Research Center in Manitoba. In 1963 he moved to the James Ford Bell Museum of Natural History in Minneapolis. He was appointed a curator for ethology and became a professor in the Faculty of Ecology, Evolution and Behavioral Science at the University of Minnesota. He held both positions until his retirement in 2000.

In the 1950s and 1960s, his research focused on the macroevolutionary aspects of social signals and other behavior patterns in ducks. The 1972 book "Sexual Selection and the Descent of Man: The Darwinian Pivot" edited by Bernard Grant Campbell (1930-2017) stimulated McKinney's interest in gender conflict and raised his doubts about older theories of pair bonding. McKinney changed his thinking on "three-bird-chase" behavior, as well as the focus of his research. During the last 20 years of his career, his research dealt with sperm competition, partner switching, and related topics.

His most important publications include "Behavioral Specializations for River Life in the African Black Duck (Anas sparsa Eyton)" (1978), "Rape Among Mallards" (1979), "Forced Copulation in Captive Mallards I. Fertilization of Eggs" (1980), "Forced copulation in captive mallards (Anas platyrhynchos): II. Temporal factors" from 1982 and "Forced Copulation in Captive Mallards III. Sperm Competition" (1983). At the University of Minnesota, he lectured on 48 different academic topics. As a professor, he supervised more than 30 students for M.S. or Ph.D. theses. He served on more than 150 Ph.D. He supervised almost 50 undergraduate research projects on animal behavior, including fish, iguanas, and primates.

He was elected in 1975 a Fellow of the American Ornithologists’ Union (A.O.U.) and in 1994 was awarded the A.O.U.'s Brewster Medal for his research on the social behavior of waterfowl. He was personally acquainted with all of the most important ethologists in the decades of the 20th century after WW II.

In 1963 McKinney married D. Meryl Morris (1924–2007). When he retired in 2000, he intended to write a comprehensive book on the social behavior of ducks. However, he suffered a severe heart attack on Christmas Day of 2000. After he slowly recovered, he and his wife wanted to move to another house to make life easier. While on an errand to get packing boxes, he suffered a second heart attack and quickly died, leaving Meryl McKinney a widow after 38 years of marriage.

Selected publications
 
 
 
 
 
 
 
 
 
 
 
 
 
 
 
 
  2012 pbk reprint
  2014 pbk reprint

References

1928 births
2001 deaths
British ornithologists
Ethologists
Alumni of the University of Oxford
Alumni of the University of Bristol
University of Minnesota faculty